The Birsa Munda International Hockey Stadium is an international field hockey stadium situated at Rourkela, India. The stadium has been named after the tribal leader, Birsa Munda, who was a famous freedom fighter. With a seating capacity of 20,011 permanent seats, it is officially recognised by the Guinness World Records as the largest fully seated hockey arena in the world on January 29, 2023.

History 
When India was bidding for the 2023 Men's FIH Hockey World Cup, it was decided that another hockey stadium would have to be built within Odisha. The government then allotted 15 acres of land for building the stadium. The responsibility of constructing the stadium was then also handed over to Odisha Industrial Infrastructure Development Corporation (IDCO). The chairman of IDCO, Sanjay Kumar Singh, also said, "The Government of Odisha has assigned us to construct a world class stadium for the Men's Hockey World Cup 2023 within the given timeline of 12 months." The foundation stone of the stadium was laid by the Chief Minister of Odisha, Naveen Patnaik in February 2021. and was inaugurated by Chief Minister of Odisha, Naveen Patnaik on 5 January 2023.

It is also the fourth largest field hockey stadium in the world. Unlike the other top three stadiums, which are terrace stadiums and are part of multi-purpose sports complex, this stadium is the largest all-seater field hockey-specific stadium which was solely constructed for the purpose of conducting field hockey matches.

Hockey World Cup 
The Birsa Munda International Hockey Stadium is being built exclusively to host the 2023 Men's FIH Hockey World Cup. This was the fourth time India hosted this event and it was also be the second time the world cup hosted in Odisha. The 2023 version of the cup held jointly between two cities in the state of Odisha, Bhubaneswar and Rourkela. Along with the Birsa Munda International Hockey Stadium, the Kalinga Stadium in Bhubaneswar were the other venue for the event.

Events

International

National

References

Field hockey venues in India
Sports venues in Odisha
Rourkela
2023 establishments in Odisha
Sports venues completed in 2023